Carhoo Hill  or Ballymacadoyle Hill is a large hill south-west of Dingle in County Kerry, Ireland.

Geography 

The top of the hill hosts the Eask Tower, a solid stone tower built in 1847. It offers a view on a long stretch of Dingle Peninsula and Iveragh Peninsula.

Name
The English meaning of Cnoc na Ceathrún  is hill of the quarter.

Access to the summit 
The walk which leads up to the summit takes 1.6 km from the asphalted road. Due to the very interesting panorama it's advisable to choose a clear day for it.

See also 

 List of Marilyns in Ireland
 Dingle Bay

References

Mountains and hills of County Kerry
Marilyns of Ireland